David Davin-Power (born 4 April 1952) is an Irish journalist, best known for his work as a political correspondent with RTÉ News and Current Affairs.

Personal life
Davin-Power was born in Dublin and was educated at University College Dublin. He is married to Dearbhla Collins, sister of Finghin Collins; he was previously married to Christine Bowen. He has five children, three by his first marriage and two by his second. He is a member of the Church of Ireland.

Broadcasting career
Davin-Power was one of the first presenters of Morning Ireland, along with David Hanly. He is also a former Northern Ireland Editor for RTÉ News and Current Affairs. In the early 1990s, he served as head of news for the now-defunct Century Radio.

In August 2001, he was made Political Correspondent with RTÉ. In March 2009, he made an infamous appearance on RTÉ News: Nine O'Clock from the Fianna Fáil Ardfheis surrounded by members of the party glaring at the camera.

In 2015, Davin-Power co-presented the RTÉ documentary Gallipoli - Ireland's Forgotten Heroes, discussing the World War I campaign from an Irish perspective.

References

External links
 

Living people
RTÉ newsreaders and journalists
1952 births
People from Portobello, Dublin